Judge Butler may refer to:

Algernon Lee Butler (1905–1978), judge of the United States District Court for the Eastern District of North Carolina
Charles R. Butler Jr. (born 1940), judge of the United States District Court for the Southern District of Alabama
William Butler (judge) (1822–1909), judge of the United States District Court for the Eastern District of Pennsylvania

See also
Pierce Butler (judge) (1866–1939), associate justice of the Supreme Court of the United States